Thomas C. Williams  (August 19, 1870 – July 27, 1940) was a 19th-century Major League Baseball player who played as both outfielder and pitcher.

External links
Baseball Reference – major league statistics

19th-century baseball players
Major League Baseball pitchers
Cleveland Spiders players
Baseball players from Ohio
1870 births
1940 deaths
Springfield, Ohio (minor league baseball) players
Canton Nadjys players
Milwaukee Brewers (minor league) players
Minneapolis Minnies players
Roanoke Magicians players
Norfolk Clams players
Norfolk Crows players
Schenectady Dorpians players
Columbus Senators players
Anderson Anders players
Indianapolis Indians players
Evansville River Rats players
South Bend Greens players